Jonathan Adams (born July 16, 1967) is an American actor. He is perhaps best known for playing Henry Walker on American Dreams, Daniel Goodman on Bones and Chuck Larabee on Last Man Standing.

Early life
Adams was born on July 16, 1967, in Pittsburgh, Pennsylvania, and grew up in Wilkinsburg.  He graduated from Wilkinsburg High School in 1985 and studied acting at Carnegie Mellon University for a year and a half before having to drop out because he could no longer afford tuition.

Career
He has appeared in several roles in American television, including American Dreams on NBC, where he played series regular Henry Walker (2002–05). He portrayed Dr. Daniel Goodman in the first season of the Fox television series Bones.  At the start of season 2, his character appointed Dr. Camille Saroyan (Tamara Taylor) to be the Jeffersonian's first head of forensics (the immediate boss of Temperance Brennan). Although he was supposed to have left on a short sabbatical, his character did not return. The show's creator, Hart Hanson, stated that Taylor's role was a better fit with the rest of the characters in the series. He later appeared in the short-lived ABC crime drama Women's Murder Club.

Between 1996 and 2000, he spent four years at the Oregon Shakespeare Festival playing, among other roles, Petruchio in The Taming of the Shrew, Buckingham in The Three Musketeers and Guy Jacobs in Blues for an Alabama Sky by Pearl Cleage. He was also a voice actor in Army of Two: The 40th Day as Tyson Rios.

Filmography

Film

Television

Video games

References

External links
 

1967 births
Living people
African-American male actors
American male stage actors
American male television actors
American male voice actors
Male actors from Pittsburgh
21st-century American male actors
21st-century African-American people
20th-century African-American people